Rowena Geisreiter (née Davis; born ) is a former New Zealand gymnast.

Davis represented her country at the 1978 Commonwealth Games in Edmonton, placing ninth in the women's individual all-around competition, and winning the bronze medal—alongside Lynette Brake, Kirsty Durward and Deborah Hurst—in the women's team all-around event. The following year, aged 14, Davis represented New Zealand at the world championships in Fort Worth, where her performance was good enough to earn selection in the New Zealand team for the 1980 Summer Olympics. However, she was unable to compete because of the partial boycott by New Zealand. Four years later, she qualified for the 1984 Summer Olympics, but was not included in the New Zealand team by the New Zealand Olympic and Commonwealth Games Association.

, she lives in Dunedin, where she is a mountain biking coach and runs cycle skills programmes in local schools.

References

1960s births
Year of birth missing (living people)
Living people
New Zealand female artistic gymnasts
Commonwealth Games bronze medallists for New Zealand
Gymnasts at the 1978 Commonwealth Games
Commonwealth Games medallists in gymnastics
20th-century New Zealand women
21st-century New Zealand women
Medallists at the 1978 Commonwealth Games